The discography of American rapper, singer and actor Nick Cannon consists of two studio albums, a compilation album, a comedy album, two mixtapes and seventeen singles. His self-titled debut studio album, Nick Cannon, was released on December 9, 2003 via Jive Records. It has peaked on the Billboard 200 chart at 83rd and the Top R&B/Hip-Hop Albums at 15th, and has sold over 200,000 certified units. His second studio album, White People Party Music, has failed to emulate similar success of its predecessor by not entering charts. It was released on April 1, 2014 via N'Credible Entertainment.

Cannon's comedy album, Mr. Showbiz, was released on May 14, 2011 via New Wave Dynamics and has charted on the Top Comedy Albums chart at 3rd and the Top R&B/Hip-Hop Albums at 66th. His following mixtape Child of the Corn, failed to chart in any country while his most recent mixtape The Gospel of Ike Turn Up: My Side of the Story, was released on November 16, 2016. His debut album spawned two singles, "Feelin' Freaky" and "Gigolo", that had charted on the national chart of the United States, which is the Billboard Hot 100, at 92nd and 24th, respectively.

Studio albums

Compilation albums

Comedy albums

Mixtapes

Singles

As lead artist

References

Discographies of American artists